Swofford is an unincorporated community in Lewis County, in the U.S. state of Washington.  The town sits on the south shore of Riffe Lake.

History
A post office called Swofford was established in 1890, and remained in operation until 1922. The community was named after T. F. Swofford, who was credited with securing a post office for the town.

References

Populated places in Lewis County, Washington
Unincorporated communities in Lewis County, Washington
Unincorporated communities in Washington (state)